The 1984 NCAA Division I-AA football rankings are from the NCAA Division I-AA football committee. This is for the 1984 season. 

 was ranked number 1 in the next to last poll of the year and was unranked in the last poll. This was the result of 14 players being declared ineligible prior to the Division I-AA final poll and playoffs. Tennessee State finished 11–0, but was not invited to the post-season.

Legend

NCAA Division I-AA Football Committee poll

Notes

References

Rankings
NCAA Division I FCS football rankings